Nikolai Ivanovich Pankin (born 2 January 1949 – 13 October 2018) was a Russian breaststroke swimmer and swimming coach. He competed at the 1968, 1972 and 1976 Olympics in the 100 m and 200 m breaststroke and 4 × 100 m medley relay. In 1968 he won a bronze medal in the 100 m and narrowly missed a bronze in the 200 m; he also swam the semifinal for the Soviet medley relay team that won a bronze medal. Pankin was less successful in 1972 and 1976, and finished close to the podium in the medley relay.

At the 1970 and 1974 European Championships, Pankin won a medal in each of the three events he competed. His last international medal was a bronze in the 200 m breaststroke at the 1975 World Championships. During his career, Pankin set four world records, two in the 100 m (1:06.2 in 1968 and 1:05.8 in 1969) and two in the 200 m (2:26.5 and 2:25.4 in 1969). Domestically, he won 13 titles, in the 100 m (1969, 1971, 1974–75), 200 m (1969, 1971, 1972, 1974–75) and in the medley relay (1965, 1969, 1973 and 1975). He retired after the 1976 Olympics and then had a long career as a swimming coach in Moscow. His trainees included Dmitry Volkov.

See also
World record progression 200 metres breaststroke

References

Olympic bronze medalists for the Soviet Union
1949 births
2018 deaths
Russian male breaststroke swimmers
Swimmers at the 1968 Summer Olympics
Swimmers at the 1972 Summer Olympics
Swimmers at the 1976 Summer Olympics
World record setters in swimming
Olympic bronze medalists in swimming
World Aquatics Championships medalists in swimming
European Aquatics Championships medalists in swimming
Medalists at the 1968 Summer Olympics
Universiade medalists in swimming
Universiade gold medalists for the Soviet Union
Universiade silver medalists for the Soviet Union
Medalists at the 1970 Summer Universiade
Medalists at the 1973 Summer Universiade
Swimmers from Moscow